The Virgin Islands competed at the 2022 Winter Olympics in Beijing, China, from 4 to 20 February 2022. It last competed in 2014.

The Virgin Islands team consisted of female athlete in skeleton. Due to Katie Tannenbaum testing positive for COVID-19, she was unable to carry her country's flag into the opening ceremony. Instead, a volunteer carried the Virgin Islands flag during the parade of nations. Meanwhile a volunteer was also the flagbearer during the closing ceremony.

Competitors
The following is the list of number of competitors participating at the Games per sport/discipline.

Skeleton 

The Virgin Islands qualified one sled in the women's event, after receiving a reallocated quota place. This marked the country's debut in the sport at the Winter Olympics. Katie Tannenbaum would finish in last place in the women's singles event, with an overall ranking of 25.

References

External links
Virgin Islands – Beijing 2022

Nations at the 2022 Winter Olympics
2022